Clem Nettles (October 10, 1930 – January 16, 2018) was an American farmer and politician.

Nettles was born in Pike County, Mississippi and graduated from Carters Creek School. He served in the United States Army during the Korean War. He lived in Jayess, Mississippi with his wife and family and was a dairy farmer. Nettles served on the North Pike School District Board and was the president of the school board. Nettles served in the Mississippi House of Representatives from 1988 to 2004 and was a Democrat. He represented the 97th district. Nettles died at his home in Jayess, Mississippi.

Notes

1930 births
2018 deaths
People from Lawrence County, Mississippi
People from Pike County, Mississippi
Military personnel from Mississippi
Farmers from Mississippi
School board members in Mississippi
Democratic Party members of the Mississippi House of Representatives